PT. Metro Batavia, operating as Batavia Air, was an airline based in the Indonesian cities of Jakarta and Surabaya. Until January 31, 2013, the airline operated domestic flights to around 42 destinations and several nearby regional international destinations, and Saudi Arabia. Its main base was Soekarno-Hatta International Airport, Jakarta. Batavia Air was listed in category 1 on the Indonesian Civil Aviation Authority airline safety rating. On January 31, 2013, at 12:00 local time, Batavia Air ceased operations after the Central Jakarta Regional Court granted a bankruptcy appeal by ILFC, the international aircraft lessor, saying that the airline owed US$4.68 million in debts, a debt that Batavia Air failed to repay after a series of financial difficulties.

History 

The airline name was taken from Batavia, which is now known as Jakarta and was the capital of the Dutch East Indies until 1945 when the city was renamed Jakarta.

The airline obtained an aviation license in 1999, established trial operations in 2001, and started operations in January 2002.  Originally known as Metro Batavia, it started operations with a wet-leased Fokker F28 aircraft from Bali Air. Batavia Air launched its first scheduled services from Jakarta to Pontianak and other routes was followed later. The airline is owned by PT Metro Batavia. Since June 2010 the airline has been taken off the list of banned carriers from flying into EU airspace, along with Indonesia AirAsia.

On July 26, 2012, AirAsia and Batavia Air issued a joint statement revealing an intention to proceed with a buy out of the airline by AirAsia Bhd for $80 million.

The planned buy out was to be in two stages; first, AirAsia was to buy 76.95% shares in a partnership with Fersindo Nusaperkasa, its Indonesian business unit operating Indonesia AirAsia.  By 2013, AirAsia was to acquire the remaining 23.05% held by other shareholders.

Indonesian  trade laws disallow majority ownership by foreign entities in local businesses but AirAsia through its sister company Fersindo Nusaperkasa planned to circumvent that law to develop a further expansion of its foothold in Indonesia's domestic market. The acquisition was anticipated to create controversy with Indonesian authorities at the time as domestic laws in Indonesia do not permit majority ownership in local airline industry by foreign nationals. That controversy did arise within days of the announcement.

At the time of the initial public announcement the Indonesian government had not granted approval for the takeover by AirAsia Berhard and Fersindo Nusaperkasa (Indonesia AirAsia). The share sale agreement signed in July outlined a commitment by AirAsia to buy a 49% stake of Batavia while its local partner, Fersindo Nusaperkasa (Indonesia Air Asia), was to acquire the majority 51%.

By 11 October 2012, the deal between AirAsia Berhard and Fersindo Nusaperkasa (Indonesia AirAsia) and PT Metro Batavia fell through.

When the cancellation of the planned takeover between Batavia and AirAsia was announced on October 11, 2012, a joint statement was issued announcing a plan to proceed with an alliance encompassing ground handling, distribution and inventory systems in Indonesia. The statement also announced a plan to deliver operational alliances between Batavia and the Air Asia group.

Batavia and Indonesia AirAsia of which AirAsia controls 49% will form a separate joint venture to provide a regional pilot training centre in Indonesia. No details were provided on that new alliance when it was announced in early October 2012.

On January 31, 2013, at 12:00 local time, Batavia Air ceased operations after the Central Jakarta Regional Court granted a bankruptcy appeal by IFLC, the international aircraft lessor, saying that the airline owed US$4,68 million in debts, a debt that Batavia Air failed to repay after a series of financial difficulties, particularly after leasing two Airbus A330 aircraft from ILFC on December 29, 2009, which was on a six-year dry-lease agreement until 2015. Six airlines were slated to take over the entire Batavia Air route network. As of February 2013, only three airlines have acquired the routes, namely Citilink, Mandala Airlines, and Sriwijaya Air.   All tickets purchased prior to the cessation of operations were either refunded or deferred to other airlines.

The Central Jakarta Trade Court appointed four liquidators, all from local law firms, to assist in the liquidation of Batavia Air.

Ownership structure

PT Metro Batavia was the controlling entity behind Batavia Air. On 11 October 2012 and after the airline dropped merger talks with Air Asia,  Batavia Air chief executive director Yudiawan Tansari stated that Batavia "will continue to seek strategic partners to develop our business”.

Destinations 

 

As of December 2012, Batavia Air flew to six international destinations in addition to its wide domestic network.

Fleet 

The Batavia Air fleet consisted of the following aircraft

Accidents and incidents
In 11 years of flight records, Batavia Air has never had any major accidents.
 On May 5, 2006, a Batavia Air 737-200 suffered hydraulic problems after takeoff and had to make an emergency landing in Jakarta Soekarno-Hatta International Airport. The plane overshot the runway during the emergency landing. Three passengers were injured.
 On November 21, 2007, a Batavia Air 737-400 lost a 40 cm by 50 cm piece of wing shortly after takeoff from Soekarno-Hatta International Airport. The aircraft safely made an emergency landing and a piece of the Boeing 737-400's wing fell onto a house nearby. Nobody was injured.

References

External links

Official website

Airlines established in 2002
Defunct airlines of Indonesia
Airlines disestablished in 2013
2013 disestablishments in Indonesia
Indonesian companies established in 2002